Piita Taqtu Irniq, formerly Peter Irniq, (born February 1, 1947) is an Inuk politician in Canada, who served as the second commissioner of Nunavut from April 2000 to April 2005.

Biography

Born in Lyon Inlet near Repulse Bay, Northwest Territories (now Naujaat, Nunavut). Irniq is an Inuit cultural teacher and has lived most of his life in the Kivalliq Region of Nunavut, including Naujaat, Coral Harbour, Baker Lake, Chesterfield Inlet, Rankin Inlet, and Iqaluit. He has also lived in the Western Arctic (Northwest Territories), Manitoba and Ontario.

Irniq was the executive assistant to the assistant commissioner of the NWT. from 1974 to 1975. He was elected to the 1975 Northwest Territories general election and represented the riding of the Keewatin Region for four years. He was the first Inuk to be made assistant regional director for the Department of the Executive in the former Keewatin Region (Kivalliq), 1979 until 1981.

As superintendent of renewable resources, he was the first Inuk to hold this position and encouraged the hiring of Inuit into the department. In 1982, Irniq was appointed the first Speaker of the Keewatin Council, a position he held until 1983. Elected [president of the Keewatin Inuit Association, he served in this capacity for five years.

Irniq was re-elected to the Northwest Territories Legislature in the 1987 general election for the Aivilik electoral district. He ran on a platform of encouraging Inuit to participate at higher levels in employment, education, and business. He ran again in the 1991 general election; however, James Arvaluk defeated him.

He was named the executive director of the Inuit Cultural Institute in 1992. A year later, he became director of communications for Nunavut Tunngavik Incorporated.

As a member of the Nunavut Implementation Commission, Irniq served on the Communication and Governmental Operations Committees and was a spokesperson for the Commission on Nunavut in Canada and overseas and was active in seeking justice for the former students of the infamous Joseph Bernier residential school in Chesterfield Inlet, who suffered physical and sexual abuse at the hands of school staff.

Irniq was assistant director, Nunavut, Heritage/Culture, Department of Education, Culture and Employment for the Government of N.W.T. where he was responsible for developing culture and heritage programs and services to meet the needs of the new territory of Nunavut, 1997–98. He became deputy minister of Culture, Language, Elders and Youth, 1998–99. His mandate was to be the guardian of traditional Inuit culture and language.

In August 1999, Irniq was seconded to the Legislative Assembly of Nunavut to set up the offices of the Official Languages, Access to Information and Conflict of Interest Commissioners.

In addition, Irniq writes an Inuit perspective column for the Nunavut News/North newspaper.

In 2003, he was made a Commander of the Order of St. John. In 2005, he was appointed to the board of directors of the Canadian Race Relations Foundation. Most recently, he served as a key consultant on the National Film Board of Canada project Unikkausivut: Sharing Our Stories.

Arms

See also
Notable Aboriginal people of Canada

References

External links
 Government of Nunavut - Biography of Peter T. Irniq
 Participants at the “Nunavut at Five” Policy Symposium
 Peter Irniq's Coat of Arms as Commissioner of Nunavut

1947 births
Living people
Inuit from the Northwest Territories
Commanders of the Order of St John
Commissioners of Nunavut
Inuit politicians
People from Baker Lake
People from Chesterfield Inlet
People from Coral Harbour
People from Iqaluit
People from Naujaat
People from Rankin Inlet
Members of the Legislative Assembly of the Northwest Territories
Writers from Nunavut
Inuit writers
Indspire Awards
Inuit from Nunavut